The Dallas World Aquarium is a for-profit aquarium and zoo located in the West End Historic District of Dallas, Texas, USA. It aids conservation and education by housing many animals that are threatened or endangered as part of a cooperative breeding program with other zoos around the world. It has been an accredited member of the Association of Zoos and Aquariums since 1997 and is a member of the World Association of Zoos and Aquariums.

History
The aquarium was opened in October 1992 in an old 1924 warehouse that had been gutted and rebuilt on the inside. In 1997, "The Orinoco - Secrets of the River" opened in an adjacent warehouse that had been similarly gutted and transformed, and the alley between the two buildings became the divide between freshwater and saltwater exhibits. In May 2000, it purchased a vacant lot behind the original warehouse for its first new construction, the Mundo Maya exhibit, which opened in August 2004. In 2015 Ben Crair of the New Republic wrote an exposé exposing the darker side of the zoo.

Exhibits

Borneo

Asian arowana
Bali myna
Banded archerfish
Blyth's hornbill
Eastern yellow-billed hornbill
Lesser bird-of-paradise
Little penguin
Matschie's tree-kangaroo
Oriental pied hornbill
Palm cockatoo
Pesquet's parrot
Pheasant pigeon
Red-tailed black cockatoo
Rhinoceros hornbill
Shoebill
Western crowned pigeon
Wompoo fruit dove
Victoria crowned pigeon

Orinoco
The upper level of the aquarium is an artificial reproduction of a rainforest canopy with several aviaries and primate enclosures. The second level consists of animals that live in the understory layer while the last level consists of several large Amazonian fish and manatees.

Free Flight

Chestnut-eared aracari
Crested oropendola
Curl-crested jay
Green oropendola
Guira cuckoo
Scarlet ibis
Venezuelan troupial

Jungle Jewels

Blue-capped manakin
Chiriqui quail-dove
Golden-collared manakin
Lance-tailed manakin
Paradise tanager
Red-capped manakin
Swallow tanager
Wattled jacana

Jungle Junction

Boat-billed heron
Giant anteater
Helmeted curassow
Toco toucan
Yellow-crowned night heron

Monkey Island
Pied tamarin
White-faced saki

Toucan Encounter 
Keel-billed toucan
Many-banded aracari

Howler Heights
Colombian red howler

Cotinga Corner

Black-necked aracari
Capuchinbird
Curl-crested aracari
Fiery-billed aracari
Guianan cock-of-the-rock

Lobo del Rio
Giant otter

Lizard Cove
Northern caiman lizard
Red-footed tortoise

Hidden Treasures

Golden-headed manakin
Golden lion tamarin
Green-billed toucan
Paradise tanager
Saffron toucanet
Wattled guan
Wattled jacana

The Cave
Emerald tree boa
Waxy monkey tree frog
Yellow-banded poison dart frog

The River's Edge
Blue discus
Cardinal tetra
Green anaconda
Yellow-headed amazon

Bats and Bugs

Budgett's frog
Common vampire bat
Cuvier's dwarf caiman
Dyeing poison dart frog
Goliath birdeater
Plumed basilisk
Strawberry poison-dart frog

Crocodile Cove
Orinoco crocodile
Mata mata
Red-bellied piranha

Flooded Forest

Arrau turtle
Aquatic caecilian
Bigtooth river stingray
Black-banded leporinus
Electric eel
Silver arowana
Yellow-spotted river turtle

Toucan Terrace

Black-necked swan
Elegant crested tinamou
Golden-headed lion tamarin
Grey-winged trumpeter
Hawk-headed parrot
Hoffmann's two-toed sloth
Ocellate river stingray
Orinoco goose
Ringed teal
Rosy-billed pochard
Spot-billed toucanet
Toco toucan

The River

Antillean manatee
Arapaima
Arrau turtle
Redtail catfish
Ripsaw catfish
Spotted sorubim
Xingu River ray

Cloud Forest Trek

The newest exhibit in the aquarium, the Cloud Forest Trek was opened in November 2021. The aquarium collaborated with SNA Displays to create a LED video screen that can transition from day to night to simulate a real-time rainforest. Here, see the only public display of three-toed sloths in the United States, plus many other Andean animals.

Rapids
White-faced whistling duck

The Lek
Andean cock-of-the-rock
Golden-headed quetzal
Plate-billed mountain toucan
Purple-throated fruitcrow

Others
Brown-throated sloth
Channel-billed toucan
Cotton-top tamarin
Southern pudu

Mundo Maya
Tropical and marine animals indigenous to Mexico and Central America are featured in this gallery. The area also has a 400,000 gallon tunnel tank with sharks and stingrays.

River Delta

Axolotl
Hernandez's helmeted basilisk
Hourglass treefrog
Jack Dempsey
Jaguar cichlid
Mexican musk turtle
Red-eared slider
Antilles pinktoe tarantula
Crevice spiny lizard

Fish of the Cenotes
Blind cave fish
Eastern screech owl

Los Petenes
Burrowing owl
Desert cottontail

Cenote
Atlantic goliath grouper
Bonnethead
Largetooth sawfish
Sandbar shark

Marine Creatures

Atlantic horseshoe crab
Bluehead wrasse
Cane toad
Arrow crab
Clarion angelfish
Foureye butterflyfish
Royal gramma
Slender seahorse

Serpent's Den
Brown basilisk
Eyelash viper
Fer-de-lance
Mexican beaded lizard

House of Zotz

Barred owl
Boa constrictor
Morelet's crocodile
Painted wood turtle
Red-eyed tree frog
Seba's short-tailed bat
Spectacled owl

Caribbean Creatures

Blue parrotfish
French angelfish
Hogfish
Lesser devil ray
Lookdown
Queen angelfish
Spotted eagle ray

Birds of El Triunfo
Harpy eagle
Keel-billed toucan
Scarlet macaw

Mayan Temple
Jaguar
Ocelot

Selva Maya
American flamingo
Black hawk-eagle
Central American agouti
Great tinamou

Pelican Reef
Brown pelican

South Africa
Cape of Good Hope
African penguin
Lake Victoria Cichlid
Rock Hyrax

Madagascar

African green pigeon
Great blue turaco
Madagascan big-headed turtle
Madagascar giant day gecko
Malagasy giant chameleon
Panther chameleon
Radiated tortoise
Tomato frog
Warty chameleon
White-crested turaco

Aquarium
The lower level houses aquaria featuring: fish, sea anemones, coral, jellyfish and other sea animals from around the world. The 10 main tanks feature the aquatic life of: Japan, Indonesia, Sri Lanka, British Columbia, Fiji, Palau, Southern Australia, Lord Howe Island and the Solomon Islands. Other tanks on display include a large tank with a  tunnel where visitors can observe fish of the continental shelf swimming around them.

Solomon Islands

Elegant unicornfish
Flashlightfish
Harlequin shrimp
Moon jelly
White-capped clownfish

Southern Australia

Big-belly seahorse
Leafy seadragon
Weedy seadragon
Tasselled anglerfish

Lord Howe Island

Combfish
McCullouch's anemonefish
Painted anthias
Spectacled angelfish
Wide-band anemonefish

Palau

Magnificent rabbitfish
Mandarin dragonet
Starck's demoiselle
Watanabe's angelfish

Fiji

Barred spinefoot
Bicolored foxface
Japanese swallowtail angelfish
Pink skunk clownfish
Sea goldie
Tomato clownfish

New Guinea

Blue hippo tang
Copperband butterflyfish
Orange clownfish
Powder Blue Tang
Razorfish
Ribboned pipefish
Yellow Tang

British Columbia
Bat star
Blackeye goby
Giant Pacific octopus

Sri Lanka

Eschmeyer's scorpionfish
Gem tang
Moorish idol
Threadfin anthias
Zebra angelfish

Denizens of the Deep
Japanese spider crab
Longspine snipefish

Indonesia

Banggai cardinalfish
Chocolate surgeonfish
Flamboyant cuttlefish
Hawkfish anthias
Ocellaris clownfish
Orange skunk clownfish
Ornate angelfish

Japan
Powder brown tang
Spotted garden eel
Wrought-iron butterflyfish

Continental Shelf

Bluespine unicornfish
Bluespotted ribbontail ray
Clown triggerfish
Dragon wrasse
Harlequin tuskfish
Humphead wrasse
Magnificent rabbitfish
Redtoothed triggerfish
Sailfin snapper

Education

The aquarium is also part of a joint initiative between local companies and corporations and the Dallas Public School district. Many of its employees are also full-time students at the School of Business and Management at the Yvonne A. Ewell Townview Magnet High School. This joint venture, as part of a work-study program by the school, emphasizes real-world business techniques and practices to teach the upcoming generation on maintaining and running the day-to-day operations of one of the city's largest and most well-known attractions.

References

External links 

Official website

Buildings and structures in Dallas
Culture of Dallas
Landmarks in Dallas
Economy of Dallas
Tourist attractions in Dallas
Aquaria in Texas
Zoos established in 1992
1992 establishments in Texas